The MTV Millennial Awards Brazil (commonly abbreviated as MTV MIAW BR) were established by MTV Brazil in 2018 to celebrate music, television and internet artists. The first edition happened in May 2018 and was hosted by Whindersson Nunes in São Paulo, Brazil.

Nominations for the 2019 edition were announced in May 2019.

List of ceremonies

Categories

Most wins

Performances

See also 
 Los Premios MTV Latinoamérica
 MTV Africa Music Awards
 MTV Europe Music Awards
 MTV Millennial Awards
 MTV Video Music Awards
 MTV Video Music Brasil

References 

Awards established in 2018
Brazilian awards
Magazine awards